= Commercial hard money =

Commercial hard money is a term describing a commercial loan that is generally non bankable. The company usually does not meet the standard banking criteria, but has real estate and or assets that are sufficient to collateralize the loan to the investors/lenders.

In recent years, an industry consensus has built that the term hard money no longer accurately describes the industry's direction, structure or attitude and that alternative terms are preferable. In March 2022, the National Private Lenders Association (NPLA), a trade group representing the industry, passed an official resolution encouraging industry participants to no longer use the term “hard money,” and instead use terms like "private lending", "bridge lending" and "transitional lending". Through this resolution, the NPLA confirmed its commitment to supporting the cessation of the use of the term “hard money” to describe the lenders or products in the industry. In addition, the American Association of Private Lenders (AAPL), another industry trade group, published an article, “The Demise of ‘Hard Money’ in a Private Lending World,” highlighting the group’s efforts since its inception to minimize the use of the hard money term. AAPL also made the change around hard money terminology the focus of its 2021 conference.

In January 2023, Scotsman Guide, a leading news source for residential and commercial mortgage originators, announced that it was renaming its listings of hard money lenders as “private money.”
